The sixth season of the American television drama series Scandal was ordered on March 3, 2016, by ABC. It began airing on January 26, 2017, in the United States on ABC. The season includes the 100th episode of the series, being the tenth episode of this season. The season was produced by ABC Studios, in association with ShondaLand Production Company; the showrunner being Shonda Rhimes.

The season continues the story of Olivia Pope's crisis management firm, Olivia Pope & Associates, and its employees, as well as staff at the White House in Washington, D.C. Season six had eleven series regulars, all returning from the previous season, out of which six are part of the original cast of eight regulars from the first season. The season continued to air in the Thursday 9:00 pm timeslot, the same as the previous season, but aired in the mid-season schedule due to Kerry Washington's pregnancy. The episode order was also shortened from 22 to 16 episodes as a result of Washington's pregnancy.

Overview
The series focuses on Olivia Pope and her crisis management firm, Olivia Pope & Associates, and its team, as well as staff at the White House in Washington, D.C., in their efforts to deal with and contain political scandals.

Cast

Main cast 

 Kerry Washington as Olivia Pope  
 Scott Foley as NSA Director Jacob "Jake" Ballard 
 Darby Stanchfield as Chief of Staff Abigail "Abby" Whelan 
 Katie Lowes as Quinn Perkins 
 Guillermo Diaz as Diego "Huck" Muñoz 
 Jeff Perry as Cyrus Beene 
 Joshua Malina as Attorney General David Rosen 
 Bellamy Young as Senator Melody "Mellie" Grant 
 Portia de Rossi as Elizabeth North 
 Joe Morton as Elijah "Eli"/"Rowan" Pope
 Cornelius Smith Jr. as Press Secretary Marcus Walker
 Tony Goldwyn as President Fitzgerald "Fitz" Thomas  Grant III

Recurring cast 
 Kate Burton as Sally Langston 
 George Newbern as Charlie
 Ricardo Chavira as Governor/President-elect Francisco Vargas
 Zoe Perry as Samantha Ruland
 David Warshofsky as Theodore Peus
 Tessie Santiago as Luna Vargas
 Brian Letscher as Tom Larsen
 Matthew Del Negro as Michael Ambruso
 Khandi Alexander as Maya Pope
 Paul Adelstein as Leo Bergen 
 Jessalyn Gilsig as Vanessa Moss
 Saycon Sengbloh as Angela Webster
 Phoebe Neidhardt as Meg Mitchell
 Chelsea Kurtz as Jennifer Fields

Episodes

Production

Development
Scandal was renewed for a sixth season on March 3, 2016, by ABC. The series continued to air at Thursdays in the timeslot 9 p.m. E.T. like the previous season. Production began in July, confirmed by executive-producer Tom Verica. After Kerry Washington announced that she was pregnant again, TVLine reported that ABC was considering moving the show's premiere to midseason. In addition, the episode order for the sixth season was reduced from 22 to 16 episodes. During ABC's annual upfront presentation in May, it was announced that Scandal will premiere during midseason, following a fall run of the new series Notorious. Production began on July 13, 2016, with director and executive producer Tom Verica announcing that the crew was scouting for filming locations. The table read for the premiere was on July 26, 2016, with filming starting soon after. A teaser trailer was released on November 1, 2016, on YouTube. An official trailer for the sixth season was released by ABC on November 3, 2016. The season began airing on January 26, 2017. A promotional poster was released by ABC on November 29, 2016. On February 10, 2017, ABC announced that the series had been renewed for a seventh season. It was later announced it will be the final season.

Writing
When talking about the presidential campaign storyline in the show, showrunner Shonda Rhimes talked to The Hollywood Reporter about the character Fitzgerald Thomas Grant III not being president anymore. She said "I can't tell you any of that—but there is a plan. Tony is not going anywhere; where would he go?!". Other cast members spoke their opinion about Grant's next arc without the presidency. Tony Goldwyn, the actor playing Fitz, commented "He'll be much happier as the post-president than as the president." Jeff Perry, playing Cyrus Beene, said that "I'd love our show to invent a great role for a president after he's out of office that would reverberate back to the real world." Executive producer Betsy Beers voiced her excitement about the character doing "anything he wanted". Other cast members compared Fitz's next move with former U.S. presidents Jimmy Carter and Bill Clinton.

In an interview with Entertainment Weekly, Rhimes talked about the presidential election and its factor into the sixth season. She said that it would in both ways, adding that "We are basically going to start our season on election night. Yes, it is going to play into our season, but we're not going to spend our time playing an election."

Casting

The sixth season had twelve roles receiving star billing, with eleven of them returning from the previous season, eight of which part of the original cast from the first season. Kerry Washington continued to play her role as protagonist of the series, Olivia Pope, a former White House Director of Communications with her own crisis management firm. Darby Stanchfield played Abby Whelan, the White House Press Secretary, Katie Lowes portrayed Quinn Perkins, and Guillermo Diaz portrayed Huck, the troubled tech guy who works for Olivia. Cornelius Smith Jr. continued his role as activist Marcus Walker. Jeff Perry portrayed Cyrus Beene, Chief of Staff at the White House who was fired by Fitz but later rehired. Portia de Rossi played Elizabeth North, the new Chief of Staff at the White House, and later the Chief of Staff for the Vice President. Joshua Malina played the role of David Rosen, former U.S. Attorney, then Attorney General. Bellamy Young continued to act as Senator Melody "Mellie" Grant, who was kicked out of the White House by Fitz, and later joined the presidential campaign for president. Tony Goldwyn continued to portray President Fitzgerald "Fitz" Thomas Grant III. Scott Foley portrayed Jake Ballard a former B613 agent and later the head of the NSA.

TVLine announced on August 6, 2016, that Glee alum Jessalyn Gilsig will replace Joelle Carter as Vanessa Moss, Jake Ballard's wife. Entertainment Weekly announced on December 5, 2016, that series regular Jeff Perry's daughter Zoe Perry had been cast in a recurring role for the sixth season. It was announced on April 20, 2017, that Portia de Rossi would be departing the show after her character was killed off in the eleventh episode.

Reception
The review aggregator website Rotten Tomatoes reports an 80% approval rating with an average rating of 7.5/10 based on 10 reviews. The website's consensus reads, "As shocking and thrilling as ever, Scandal eases into its sixth season with as much confidence as Olivia Pope herself."

Live + SD ratings

Live + 7 day (DVR) ratings

Awards and nominations

References

External links
 
 

2017 American television seasons
Season 6